The Chamjilli Line is a non-electrified freight-only railway line of the Korean State Railway in South P'yŏngan Province, North Korea from Kangsŏn on the P'yŏngnam Line to Chamjilli.

Services

The line serves several above-ground factories and the Namp'o Kangsŏ Missile Factory, which is an underground facility with a rail spur entering the underground complex. In the past there was also a section leading to another (now closed) factory, and to the Kangsŏ Colliery.

Route 

A yellow background in the "Distance" box indicates that section of the line is not electrified.

References

Railway lines in North Korea
Standard gauge railways in North Korea